The  is a tolled single-point urban interchange along the Aomori Expressway in Aomori, Japan. It is the closest expressway interchange to the center of that city.  The interchange is owned, tolled, and operated by East Nippon Expressway Company.

Description
The Aomori-chūō Interchange, south of Central Aomori, is a continuous green-T hybrid interchange. It is a junction of the Aomori Expressway and the Aomori Belt Highway (National Route 7), which serves as an access road along much of the expressway.

It is the only interchange with three or more levels in the city and one of three in Aomori Prefecture.
The roadways on the three levels are: 
Level I:  National Route 7 and an unnamed road signed to a business park named Tonya-machi (問屋町).
Level II: Aomori Expressway and ramps to and from eastbound Aomori Expressway
Level III: Ramps to and from westbound Aomori Expressway
Toll booths are located along Aomori Expressway and at the converging point of the interchange's ramps.

History
Construction on Aomori-chūō Interchange began in 1999, prior to the opening of the Aomori Expressway. The interchange was opened on September 28, 2003 at a cost of 79.5 billion Japanese yen. The completion of the expressway and interchange reduced travel times from the Tōhoku Expressway to Central Aomori by 11 minutes and reduced congestion along the Aomori West Bypass.

References

External links 
 Google Maps Satellite View

Road interchanges in Japan
Tōhoku Expressway
Roads in Aomori Prefecture